The Tetraplosphaeriaceae are a family of fungi in the order Pleosporales.

References

Pleosporales
Dothideomycetes families
Taxa described in 2009